Petr Korda and Tomáš Šmíd were the defending champions, but lost in the semifinals to Per Henricsson and Nicklas Utgren.

Pieter Aldrich and Danie Visser won the title by defeating Henricsson and Utgren 6–3, 6–4 in the final.

Seeds
All seeds received a bye into the second round.

Draw

Finals

Top half

Bottom half

References

External links
 Official results archive (ATP)
 Official results archive (ITF)

Stuttgart Doubles
Doubles 1990